Jack Fritz (born 1950) is a Micronesian politician from Chuuk State. He served as the Speaker of the Congress of the Federated States of Micronesia from 1987 to 2003

Fritz was elected to the Congress of Micronesia in 1981, until he lost his seat in the 2003 elections.

References

1950 births
Living people
People from Chuuk State
Speakers of the Congress of the Federated States of Micronesia
Federated States of Micronesia politicians